Vidria vespa is a proetid trilobite belonging to the  family Phillipsiidae.  The fossils are found in Middle Permian-aged marine strata of Western Texas.  It is unique among Permian-aged trilobites in having a posterior spine emanating from the pygidium of the adult (two such posterior spines are present in immature individuals).

References

 Proetida fact sheet 

Permian trilobites
Trilobites of North America
Philipsidae
Proetida genera